Kyriaki Kydonaki (born 7 February 2001) is a Greek karateka. She is a gold medalist at the Mediterranean Games and a bronze medalist at the European Karate Championships.

She competed in the girls' +59 kg event at the 2018 Summer Youth Olympics held in Buenos Aires, Argentina. She was eliminated in the elimination round and she did not advance to the semi-finals.

In 2022, she won one of the bronze medals in the women's +68 kg event at the European Karate Championships held in Gaziantep, Turkey. She defeated Lucija Lesjak of Croatia in her bronze medal match. A month later, she won the gold medal in the women's +68 kg event at the 2022 Mediterranean Games held in Oran, Algeria. In the final, she defeated Milena Jovanović of Montenegro.

Achievements

References 

Living people
2001 births
Place of birth missing (living people)
Greek female karateka
Karateka at the 2018 Summer Youth Olympics
Competitors at the 2022 Mediterranean Games
Mediterranean Games medalists in karate
Mediterranean Games gold medalists for Greece
21st-century Greek women